Wild in the Streets is a 1968 American comedy-drama film directed by Barry Shear and starring Christopher Jones, Hal Holbrook, and Shelley Winters. Based on the short story "The Day It All Happened, Baby!" by Robert Thom, it was distributed by American International Pictures. The film, described as both "ludicrous" and "cautionary", was nominated for an Academy Award for Best Film Editing and became a cult classic of the 1960s counterculture.

Plot
Popular rock singer and aspiring revolutionary Max Frost (Christopher Jones) was born Max Jacob Flatow Jr. His first public act of violence was blowing up his family's new car. Frost's band, the Troopers, live together with him, their women, and others, in a sprawling Beverly Hills mansion. The band includes his 15-year-old genius attorney Billy Cage (Kevin Coughlin) on lead guitar, ex-child actor and girlfriend Sally LeRoy (Diane Varsi) on keyboards, hook-handed Abraham Salteen (Larry Bishop) on bass guitar and trumpet, and anthropologist Stanley X (Richard Pryor) on drums. Max's band performs a song noting that 52% of the population is 25 or younger, making young people the majority in the country.

When Max is asked to sing at a televised political rally by Kennedyesque Senate candidate Johnny Fergus (Hal Holbrook), who is running on a platform to lower the voting age from 21 to 18, he and the Troopers appear – but Max stuns everyone by calling instead for the voting age to become 14, then finishes the show with an improvised song, "Fourteen or Fight!", and a call for a demonstration. Max's fans – and other young people, by the thousands – stir to action, and within 24 hours protests have begun in cities around the United States. Fergus's advisors want him to denounce Max, but instead he agrees to support the demonstrations, and change his campaign – if Max and his group will compromise, accept a voting age of 15 instead, abide by the law, and appeal to the demonstrators to go home peaceably. Max agrees, and the two appear together on television – and in person the next day, using the less offensive mantra "Fifteen and Ready".

Most states agree to lower the voting age within days, in the wake of the demonstrations, and Max Frost and the Troopers campaign for Johnny Fergus until the election, which he wins by a landslide. Taking his place in the Senate, Fergus wishes Frost and his people would now just go away, but instead they get involved with Washington politics. When a Congressman from Sally LeRoy's home district dies suddenly, the band enters her in the special election that follows, and Sally – the eldest of the group, and the only one of majority age to run for office – is voted into Congress by the new teen bloc.

The first bill Sally introduces is a constitutional amendment to lower the age requirements for national political office to 14, and "Fourteen or Fight!" enters a new phase. A joint session of Congress is called, and the Troopers – now joined by Fergus's son, Jimmy (Michael Margotta) – swing the vote their way by spiking the Washington, D.C. water supply with LSD, and providing all the Senators and Representatives with teenaged escorts.

As teens either take over or threaten the reins of government, the "Old Guard" (those over 40) turn to Max to run for president, and assert his (their) control over the changing tide. Max again agrees, running as a Republican to his chagrin, but once in office, he turns the tide on his older supporters. Thirty becomes a mandatory retirement age, while those over 35 are rounded up, sent to "re-education camps", and permanently dosed on LSD. Fergus unsuccessfully attempts to dissuade Max by contacting his estranged parents (Bert Freed and Shelley Winters), then tries to assassinate him. Failing at this, he flees Washington, D.C. with his remaining family, but they are soon rounded up.

With youth now in control of the United States, politically as well as economically, similar revolutions break out in all the world's major countries. Max withdraws the military from around the world (turning them instead into de facto "age police"), puts computers and prodigies in charge of the gross national product, ships surplus grain for free to Third World nations, disbands the FBI and Secret Service, and becomes the leader of "the most truly hedonistic society the world has ever known".

Ultimately however, Max and his cohorts may face future intergenerational warfare from an unexpected source: pre-teen children. When a young girl finds out Max's age (which is now 24), she sneers, "That's old!" Later, after Max kills a crawdad that was a pet to several young kids, then mocks their youth and powerlessness, one of the kids resolves, "We're gonna put everybody over 10 out of business."

Cast

 Shelley Winters as Mrs. Max Flatow (Frost)
 Christopher Jones as Max Jacob Flatow Jr., a.k.a. Max Frost
 Diane Varsi as Sally LeRoy
 Hal Holbrook as Senator Fergus
 Millie Perkins as Mrs. Fergus
 Richard Pryor as Stanley X
 Bert Freed as Max Jacob Flatow Sr.
 Kevin Coughlin as Billy Cage
 Larry Bishop as the Hook
 Michael Margotta as Jimmy Fergus
 Ed Begley as Senator Allbright
 May Ishihara as Fuji Elly
 Salli Sachse as hippie mother
 Kellie Flanagan as young Mary Fergus
 Don Wyndham as Joseph Fergus

Production notes
The film was shot in 15 days.

Lowering the voting age was a genuine issue in 1968 and was not passed until 1970 with Oregon v. Mitchell lowering the presidential minimum voting age to 18 and 1971 with the 26th Amendment lowering local and state election minimum voting ages to 18.

The movie features cameos from several media personalities, including Melvin Belli, Dick Clark, Pamela Mason, Army Archerd, and Walter Winchell. Millie Perkins and Ed Begley have supporting roles, and Bobby Sherman interviews Max as president. In a pre-Brady Bunch role, Barry Williams plays the teenaged Max Frost at the beginning of the movie. Child actress Kellie Flanagan, who plays Johnny Fergus's daughter Mary appeared in director Barry Shear's television special All Things Bright and Beautiful in the same year. She discussed filming Wild in the Streets in a 2014 interview with Adam Gerace, telling him "I get a huge kick out of Wild in the Streets and always have."

According to filmmaker Kenneth Bowser, the part eventually played by Christopher Jones was offered to folk singer Phil Ochs. After reading the screenplay, Ochs rejected the offer, claiming the story distorted the actual nature of the youth counterculture of the period.

Music
A soundtrack album was released on Tower Records and became successful, peaking at #12 on the Billboard charts. Taken from the soundtrack and film, "Shape of Things to Come" (written by songwriters Barry Mann and Cynthia Weil) and performed by the fictional band Max Frost and the Troopers, was released as a single (backed with "Free Lovin' ") and became a hit, reaching #22 on Billboard.

Reception
On the review aggregator website Rotten Tomatoes, Wild in the Streets holds an approval rating of 67%, based on 21 critic reviews with an average rating of 5.8/10. 

Roger Ebert of the Chicago Sun-Times unfavorably compared Wild in the Streets to Privilege (1967), another film that dealt with politics driving the worship of pop idols. Despite the two-star rating, he admitted that the former was the more effective of the two because it has a greater understanding of its teenage audience. He added, "It's a silly film, but it does communicate in the simplest, most direct terms."

Renata Adler of The New York Times raved about the movie, declaring it "by far the best American film of the year so far" and compared it to The Battle of Algiers (1967).

Release
Wild in the Streets was released in theaters in 1968. Its plot was a reductio ad absurdum projection of contemporary issues of the time, taken to extremes, and played poignantly during 1968 —an election year with many controversies (the Vietnam War, the draft, civil rights, the population explosion, rioting and assassinations, and the baby boomer generation coming of age). The original magazine short story, titled "The Day It All Happened, Baby!" was expanded by its author to book length, and was published as a paperback novel by Pyramid Books.

In 1969, Fred R. Feitshans Jr. and Eve Newman were both nominated for the Oscar for Best Film Editing for their work on this film.

Wild in the Streets was released on VHS in the late 1980s, and in 2005 appeared on DVD, on a Midnite Movies disc with 1971's Gas-s-s-s.

In popular culture 
The League of Extraordinary Gentlemen, Volume III: Century, page 43, panels 1–2: "I mean that the current president of the United States is Max Foster. Max Foster the pop singer. He's setting up camps for anyone he thinks is too straight. It's hippy fascism."  This is a reference to Wild in the Streets in which singer Max Frost becomes president and has everyone over 35 sent to "re-education camps". Max Foster is an analogue of American president Richard Nixon.

See also
 Prez (1973), a DC Comics series about the first teenage president of the United States
 Generation gap
 Hippie exploitation films
 Youth empowerment
 Youth voice
 List of American films of 1968

References

External links 
 
 
 
 
 

1968 films
1960s exploitation films
Ageism in fiction
American International Pictures films
American political satire films
American rock musicals
American satirical films
American exploitation films
Films about drugs
Films about fictional presidents of the United States
Films based on short fiction
Films produced by Burt Topper
Films scored by Les Baxter
Films set in the 1960s
Films about runaways
Lysergic acid diethylamide
Hippie films
Films directed by Barry Shear
1960s English-language films
1960s American films